

Rudolf Bogatsch (4 September 1891 – 5 June 1970) was a general in the Luftwaffe of Nazi Germany during World War II who commanded the IV. Flakkorps.  He was a recipient of the Knight's Cross of the Iron Cross.

Awards and decorations

 Knight's Cross of the Iron Cross on 20 March 1942 as General der Flieger and General der Luftwaffe beim Oberbefehlshaber des Heeres

References

Citations

Bibliography

 

1891 births
1970 deaths
Military personnel from Wrocław
People from the Province of Silesia
Luftwaffe World War II generals
German Army personnel of World War I
Prussian Army personnel
Recipients of the clasp to the Iron Cross, 1st class
Recipients of the Knight's Cross of the Iron Cross
German prisoners of war in World War II held by the United States
Burials at Munich Waldfriedhof
Generals of Aviators